Sultanhisar  may refer to:

 In geography
 Sultanhisar, a town and a small district of Aydın Province, Turkey

 Ships
 Ottoman torpedo boat Sultanhisar, a torpedo boat of the Ottoman Navy
 TCG Sultanhisar, three ships of the Turkish Navy, including the above